Earl Holliman (born September 11, 1928) is an American film and TV actor who appeared in 97 features between 1952 and 2000, including recurring roles on the television series Hotel de Paree, Wide Country, Police Woman, The Thorn Birds, P.S. I Luv U, Delta, Caroline in the City, and Night Man (along with various guest spots on several game and talk shows). He won a Golden Globe Award in 1957 for Best Supporting Actor in a Motion Picture for his work in The Rainmaker (1956). This is his complete filmography, as well as his awards, nominations, and personal appearances.

Films

Episodic television

Non-acting appearances

Awards and nominations

Unmade films

References

Holliman, Earl
Holliman, Earl